Alfred Carlton (13 November 1867 – 10 September 1941) was an Australian cricketer. He played three first-class cricket matches for Victoria between 1893 and 1901.

See also
 List of Victoria first-class cricketers

References

External links
 

1867 births
1941 deaths
Australian cricketers
Victoria cricketers
People from Bacchus Marsh